Tropicimonas aquimaris is a Gram-negative, aerobic, rod-shaped and non-motile bacterium from the genus of Tropicimonas which has been isolated from seawater from the South Sea in Korea.

References

External links
Type strain of Tropicimonas aquimaris at BacDive -  the Bacterial Diversity Metadatabase

Rhodobacteraceae
Bacteria described in 2012